List of United States Navy and Coast Guard ships lost during World War II, from 31 October 1941 to 31 December 1946, sorted by type and name.  This listing also includes constructive losses, which are ships that were damaged beyond economical repair and disposed of. The list does not include United States Merchant Marine ships, many which had United States Navy Armed Guard units.

Combatants

Battleships (BB)

Note - USS Utah (AG-16) (ex BB-31) is not listed as a battleship as it had been converted to an anti-aircraft gunnery training ship by the time of her sinking; it is included in the sub-section "Other auxiliaries".

Aircraft carriers (CV/CVL)

Escort aircraft carriers (CVE)

Heavy cruisers (CA)

Light cruisers (CL)

Destroyers (DD)

Destroyer escorts (DE)

Submarines (SS)

Note - Although most sources list 52 US submarines as lost during World War II, the above listing includes two others, Halibut and Lancetfish, which were damaged beyond economical repair and were subsequently scrapped without returning to active service.  At least 11 of the submarines listed above were lost due to accidents, including 1 (S-26) by a collision, 3 (R-12, S-28 and Lancetfish) by flooding, 4 (S-27, S-36, S-39 and Darter) by groundings and 3 (Tang, Tullibee and Grunion) sunk by circular runs of their own torpedoes.  Two other submarines, Dorado and Seawolf, were probably sunk in friendly fire incidents.

Patrol craft

Gunboats (PG/PGM/PE)

River gunboats (PR)

Converted yachts (PY/PYc)

Submarine chasers (PC/SC)

Patrol torpedo boats (PT)

20 PT boats were destroyed by grounding, another 9 were sunk by friendly fire and 10 more were lost due to other accidents.

District patrol vessels (YP)

Only two YPs were lost due to enemy action.  All others were lost due to accidents.

Mine warfare ships

Minelayers (CM, DM)

Destroyer minesweepers (DMS)

Minesweepers (AM/AMc)

Motor Minesweepers (YMS)

Amphibious warfare ships

Tank landing ships (LST)

Medium landing ships (LSM)

Tank landing craft (LCT)

Infantry landing craft (LCI(L), LCI(G))

Support landing craft (LCS)

Auxiliaries

Seaplane tenders (AV, AVP, AVD)

Cargo ships (AK/AKS)

Net layers (AN)

Oilers (AO/AOG)

Troop transports (AP/APA/APc)

High speed transports (APD)

Barracks ships (APL)

Repair ships (ARS/ARL)

Submarine rescue ships (ASR)

Tugboats (AT/ATA/ATF/ATR)

Other auxiliaries

Unclassified miscellaneous (IX)

District craft

Uncovered lighters (YC)

Covered lighters (YF)

Ferry boats (YFB)

Floating dry docks (YFD)

Self propelled barges (YSP)

Yard oilers (YO, YON)

Harbor tugboats (YT, YTM)

Water barges (YW)

Other district craft

Coast Guard cutters

Four, possibly five, Coast Guard cutters were lost due to enemy action, all others were lost in accidents.

US Army ships

See also
 List of ships of the United States Navy
 List of US Navy ships sunk or damaged in action during World War II - a similar list but with more ships and in narrative form

References

External links
navsource.org: Naval losses
Dictionary of American Naval Fighting Ships
U.S. Coast Guard losses 

List, Losses
.Losses
World War II, Losses
World War II, Navy losses
Navy losses
United States Navy losses
Navy losses